Ivan Hrynokh (December 28, 1907-October 14, 1994) was a Ukrainian Greek-Catholic priest and Ukrainian community activist.

Born in the village of Pavliv near Lviv to Mykhailo and Anastiya Hrynokh on December 29, 1907, his parents emigrated to the United States in 1909 and settled in Philadelphia where his brother Stepan was born in 1911. The family returned to their home village in 1911.

Ivan received his high school education in Lviv and commenced theological studies there which he completed with a doctorate studying in Innsbruck, Munich and Paris. He took on priestly vows in 
September 1932 from Metropolitan Andrei Sheptytsky and taught philosophy and theology at the Theological Academy in Lviv. He was arrested by the Polish government in 1938 and remained incarcerated at the Bereza Kartuska detention camp until the fall of Poland.

With the amalgamation of Western Ukraine by the Soviets, father Hrynokh traveled to Krakow where he preached and was active in Ukrainian politics. He became the chaplain to the Nachtigall Battalion. After the dissolution of the Battalion, he participated in the 3rd Great Conference of the Organization of Ukrainian Nationalists which took place in Ukraine in 1943, and was one of the instigators of the Ukrainian Supreme Liberation Council where he was elected Vice President in July 1944.

In this position he fulfilled a diplomatic mission in talks with the Romanian and Hungarian governments. He was sent to the West to find alliances for the UPA with the Allied forces and traveled via Prague to Germany settling in Munich. In 1950 he became the head of the foreign section of the UHVR which he chaired until 1980. Simultaneously he was the head of the Society for foreign studies and founded the newspaper "Suchasna Ukraina" (Contemporary Ukraine), "Ukrainska Literaturna hazeta" (The Ukrainian literary newspaper) and the magazine "Suchasnist'" (Today).

He continued teaching theology and philosophy in seminaries in Hischberg, Kulenburg and was a professor at the Ukrainian Free University in Munich.

With the release by the Soviets of Metropolitan Joseph Slipyj in 1963 a Ukrainian Catholic University was established in Rome where he became professor. He was one of the founders of the Patriarchal movement for the Ukrainian-Catholic Church.

Father Ivan Hrynokh died October 14, 1994 in Munich at the age of 87. He was buried in Pennsylvania.

References
 Іван Гриньох: душпастир і політик 

1907 births
1994 deaths
People from Lviv Oblast
Ukrainian Austro-Hungarians
People from the Kingdom of Galicia and Lodomeria
Organization of Ukrainian Nationalists politicians
Eastern Catholic priests
Academic staff of Ukrainian Catholic University
Ukrainian Eastern Catholics
Ukrainian people of World War II
Ukrainian politicians before 1991
Ukrainian military chaplains
World War II chaplains
20th-century Christian clergy
Ukrainian nationalists
Ukrainian language activists